Setchey SSSI is a  geological Site of Special Scientific Interest  south of King's Lynn in  Norfolk. It is a Geological Conservation Review site.

This site throws light on sea level changes in the Holocene, the period since the end of the last ice age, 11,700 years ago. It is part of a network of Fenland sites which allows correlation across the area.

The site is private land with no public access.

References

Sites of Special Scientific Interest in Norfolk
Geological Conservation Review sites